Abercairney railway station served the Abercairny estates in the Scottish county of Perth and Kinross.

History
Opened on 21 May 1866 by the Crieff and Methven Junction Railway, then absorbed by the Caledonian Railway, it became part of the London, Midland and Scottish Railway during the Grouping of 1923. Passing on to the Scottish Region of British Railways on nationalisation in 1948, the station was closed to passenger traffic by British Railways on 1 October 1951.

References

Notes

Sources 
 
 
 
 Abercairney station on navigable O. S. map

Disused railway stations in Perth and Kinross
Railway stations in Great Britain opened in 1866
Railway stations in Great Britain closed in 1951
1866 establishments in Scotland
Former Caledonian Railway stations